Ganyan Kita Kamahal (International title: That's How Much I Love You) is a 1998 Philippine television drama romance series broadcast by GMA Network. Directed by Jay Altarejos, it stars Carmina Villarroel, Bobby Andrews and Onemig Bondoc. It premiered on April 13, 1998. The series concluded on August 7, 1998 with a total of 85 episodes.

Cast and characters

Lead cast
 Carmina Villarroel as Eloisa Espiritu
 Bobby Andrews as Henry Cortez
 Onemig Bondoc as Jules Alonzo

Supporting cast
 Sandy Andolong as Teresa
 Gladys Reyes as Gwen
 Bart Guingona as Julian
 Ramon Recto as Gonzalo 
 Dindi Gallardo as Greta
 Kim delos Santos as Isabel
 Dino Guevarra as Marlon
 Angela Zamora as Bettina

Recurring cast
 Lee Robin Salazar
 Katya Santos
 Carmen Enriquez
 Ynez Veneracion
 Nonie Buencamino
 Maureen Mauricio
 Richard Quan
 Sheree Lara
 Joko Diaz
 Maricel Morales
 Naty Santiago
 Ardie Aquino

References

External links
 

1998 Philippine television series debuts
1998 Philippine television series endings
Filipino-language television shows
GMA Network drama series
Philippine romance television series
Television series by Viva Television
Television shows set in the Philippines